Eugene Parkinson may refer to:
 Eugene D. Parkinson, American farmer and politician
 Eugene Condell Leonard Parkinson, Jamaican politician